Admir Masic is a scientist, currently an Associate Professor at the Massachusetts Institute of Technology.
His research involves characterization of complex biomineralized and archaeological structural materials with the objective of inspiring the design of more sustainable and durable building materials.

Early life 
Masic was born in Bosnia and Herzegovina, and became a teenage refugee in Croatia during the Bosnian War in 1992. While in Croatia, he enrolled as a nonmatriculating student at a technical high school. He displayed a strong performance in chemistry while in school, and as a result, was eventually approved to receive a high school diploma. With the help of generous sponsors, he continued his higher education at the University of Turin. While in Turin, he co-founded the company, Adamantio srl, which works to preserve ancient cultural heritage. Masic has a doctorate in physical chemistry from the University of Turin, and is currently Associate Professor at MIT.

Research interests 
Masic is the principal investigator for the Laboratory for Multiscale Characterization and Materials Design at MIT. His research is focused on the topics of chemomechanics, the multiscale characterization of biological and antiquity-inspired materials, and the design of new building materials that are more durable and more sustainably produced than today's common construction materials.

Initiatives 
While at MIT, Masic has served as the faculty founder for the Refugee ACTion Hub (ReACT), which has three primary goals: "community engagement within MIT and beyond; the development of a certification system for displaced learners; and an outreach effort to connect with broader audiences."

References

Year of birth missing (living people)
Living people
Massachusetts Institute of Technology faculty
21st-century American engineers
Bosnian American